"Location" is the debut single by American singer Khalid Robinson. It was uploaded to SoundCloud on April 30, 2016, and released commercially in May 2016, serving as the lead single from his debut studio album American Teen (2017). The track was produced by Syk Sense, Tunji Ige, and Chris McClenney, with additional production from Smash David, Alfredo Gonzalez, Austin Mensales, and Taz Taylor. The song has been certified Diamond by the Recording Industry Association of America (RIAA) and was recorded at Beacon Hill Recording Studios. “Location” was nominated for Best R&B Song at the 60th Annual Grammy Awards.

Background
While talking about the song in an interview with Pigeons & Planes, Khalid expressed his passion of the song's beat:

"Location" is a song that came to me out of nowhere. From the first time I heard the beat play, the words flew out. Hearing the chords instantly took me the first stage of a relationship. Young love, man. It’s a crazy thing. I first started making music in the winter of 2015 so this is one of my most developed songs so far."

Music video
The song's accompanying music video premiered on September 26, 2016, on Khalid's Vevo account on YouTube and was directed by Alex Di Marco. As of March 2023, the music video has over 546 million views.

Remix
Three remixes have been released. The first one, the official remix featuring Lil Wayne and Kehlani was released on March 17, 2017. Another remix featuring Little Simz was released on January 26, 2017. The third remix featuring Jorja Smith and Wretch 32 was released on February 9, 2018.

Track listing
Digital download
”Location” (Remix) (featuring Lil Wayne and Kehlani) – 4:38

Digital download
”Location” (London Remix) (featuring Little Simz) – 4:05

Digital download
”Location” (Remix) (featuring Jorja Smith and Wretch 32) – 3:29

Charts

Weekly charts

Year-end charts

Certifications

Notes

References 

2016 songs
2016 debut singles
RCA Records singles
Khalid (singer) songs
Songs written by Khalid (singer)
Songs written by Smash David